The Glenwood Bridge is a cantilever bridge in Pittsburgh, Pennsylvania, which carries Pennsylvania Route 885 over the Monongahela River.  It started construction on June 3, 1958 and was completed in 1966 to replace an old decayed unsafe iron bridge built in 1894 which carried Pittsburgh Railways streetcar tracks and vehicle traffic on a wooden deck.

History

Glenwood bridge (1894)
The original bridge was built by the Penn Bridge Company of Beaver Falls and carried trolley tracks between Pittsburgh and Homestead. It was later paved with wood to allow vehicle traffic to share the crossing. Permission was given by the Public Utilities Commission on November 8, 1962 for Pittsburgh Railways to convert trolley routes 55 East Pittsburgh via Homestead and Braddock and 98 Glassport to bus service, as the replacement bridge planned did not incorporate trolley tracks. Trolley service 55 across the bridge ended on July 4, 1964.

South interchange
At the southern end of the bridge is an expressway-style interchange with Pennsylvania Route 837. This interchange was built for a spur of the cancelled "East-West Expressway", which was at the proposal stage when the bridge was built.

See also

List of crossings of the Monongahela River

References

Bridges in Pittsburgh
Bridges over the Monongahela River
Bridges completed in 1966
Road bridges in Pennsylvania
Cantilever bridges in the United States
Metal bridges in the United States